Café Transit (in USA known as Border Cafe) is a 2005 Iranian film directed by Kambuzia Partovi. It was Iran's submission to the 79th Academy Awards for the Academy Award for Best Foreign Language Film, but was not nominated for the award. It was awarded best film in the 9th Dhaka International Film Festival.

See also

Cinema of Iran
List of submissions to the 79th Academy Awards for Best Foreign Language Film

References

External links

2005 films
2000s Persian-language films
2005 drama films
Iranian drama films
Films whose writer won the Best Screenplay Crystal Simorgh